The Angénieux retrofocus photographic lens is a wide-angle lens design that uses an inverted telephoto configuration. The popularity of this lens design made the name retrofocus synonymous with this type of lens. The Angénieux retrofocus for still cameras was introduced in France in 1950 by Pierre Angénieux.

Inverted telephoto concept
The telephoto lens configuration combines positive and negative lens groups with the negative at the rear, serving to magnify the image, which reduces the back focal distance of the lens (the distance between the back of the lens and the image plane) to a figure shorter than the focal length. This is for practical, not optical reasons, because it allows telephoto lenses to be made shorter and less cumbersome. The first practical telephoto lens was developed by Peter Barlow in the early 1800s, with the eponymous Barlow lens referring to the negative achromat inserted between the eye and a telescope.

The inverted telephoto configuration does the reverse, employing one or more negative lens groups at the front to increase the back focal distance of the lens – possibly to a figure greater than the focal length – in order to allow for additional optical or mechanical parts to fit behind the lens. The negative front group also serves to increase peripheral illumination; some symmetric wide-angle lenses require a radially-graduated filter or other means to make the exposure even across the frame.

The inverted telephoto design was first employed in the 1930s by Taylor-Hobson for the early Technicolor "3-strip" cameras since the beam splitter unit behind the lens required significant space, so that a long back focal distance was essential. Horace Lee patented an inverted telephoto lens design in 1930 with an angle of view of 50° and maximum aperture of 2 which afforded a distance between the rear element and the film plane approximately 10% greater than the focal length. Joseph Ball showed how a beam-splitting apparatus could be fitted in the space gained. Also, wide-angle lenses for narrow-gauge movie cameras had to be of this type because of the shutter mechanism that had to fit in between.

In still photography, a single-lens reflex camera requires a space for the reflex mirror, imposing a limit on the use of wide-angle lenses of symmetric designs. The retrofocus lens addressed this situation by increasing the distance between the rear element and the focal plane, thus making wider-angle lenses usable while retaining normal viewing and focusing. Unless the reflex mirror were locked in the "up" position, blacking out the viewfinder, the rearmost element(s) of a non-retrofocus (symmetric wide-angle) lens would interfere with the movement of the mirror as it flipped up and down during exposure.

Implementation
Pierre Angénieux applied for a patent in 1950. In the original patent, he presented two lenses with an angle of view of 65°, approximately equal to the view of a f=35 mm lens on the 35mm format for still cameras; the first example had a maximum aperture of 2.5, while the second example had a maximum aperture of 2.2. The Angénieux corporation coined the name Retrofocus for its line of inverted telephoto wide-angles, and the name has become synonymous as a generic trademark for similar lens designs.
 

Carl Zeiss Oberkochen also created an inverted telephoto design branded Distagon (5.6/60 mm) for the Hasselblad 1000F in 1952. In 1955, Harry Zöllner and Rudolf Solisch applied for a similar patent on an inverted telephoto lens design, branded Flektogon, for Carl Zeiss Jena, which uses a single negative meniscus element ahead of a Double-Gauss lens.

Made as 24 mm, 3.5/28 mm, and 2.5/35 mm, the Angénieux Retrofocus lens line inspired other manufacturers to produce wide-angle lenses of this type for almost every 35mm SLR, and helped to make it the definitive camera type of the late 20th century.

References

Bibliography
  
  

Photographic lens designs